Smashing Through may refer to:
 Smashing Through (1929 film), a British silent adventure film
 Smashing Through (1918 film), an American silent Western film